Baptiste Carême (born 25 October 1985) is a French badminton player. In 2013, he won bronze medal at the Mediterranean Games in men's doubles event.

Achievements

Mediterranean Games 
Men's doubles

BWF Grand Prix 
The BWF Grand Prix had two levels, the Grand Prix and Grand Prix Gold. It was a series of badminton tournaments sanctioned by the Badminton World Federation (BWF) and played between 2007 and 2017.

Men's doubles

 BWF Grand Prix Gold tournament
  BWF Grand Prix tournament

BWF International Challenge/Series 
Men's doubles

Mixed doubles

  BWF International Challenge tournament
  BWF International Series tournament
  BWF Future Series tournament

References

External links 
 
 

1985 births
Living people
People from Grande-Synthe
French male badminton players
Mediterranean Games bronze medalists for France
Competitors at the 2013 Mediterranean Games
Sportspeople from Nord (French department)
Mediterranean Games medalists in badminton